VectorDB was a database of  sequence information for  common vectors used in molecular biology

See also
 Univec
 Plasmid

References

External links
 http://genome-www.stanford.edu/vectordb//

Biological databases
Mobile genetic elements
Molecular biology techniques